Marcus Rojas (born February 23, 1963) is an American tubist from New York City.

Early life
Rojas was born in New York City on February 23, 1963, and grew up in Red Hook, Brooklyn. His early influences included Eddie Palmieri, Willie Colón, and uncles who played percussion and trombone. He began on trombone at elementary school, then changed to tuba in junior high school. At age 15, Rojas began lessons with tubist Samuel Pilafian. He went on to attend the High School of Music & Art in New York, and studied further at the New England Conservatory.

Career
"After graduation, he moved back to New York and started to work with a wide variety of musicians in different settings, including bassist Charlie Haden's Liberation Music Orchestra, composer-saxophonist Henry Threadgill's Very Very Circus, trumpeter Lester Bowie's Brass Fantasy." He has played in the orchestras of the Metropolitan Opera and the New York City Ballet.

Rojas formed the trio Spanish Fly with Steven Bernstein and David Tronzo in 1989. He has also worked with the American Symphony Orchestra, Foetus, Sly & Robbie, and John Zorn.

He has taught at New York University, State University of New York at Purchase, and Brooklyn College.

Discography

As co-leader
 Brass Bang! with Steven Bernstein, Paolo Fresu, Gianluca Petrella (Bonsai/Tuk, 2014)
 Tattoos And Mushrooms with Steven Bernstein, Kresten Osgood (ILK Music, 2009)

As sideman
With Bob Belden
 1991 Straight to My Heart: The Music of Sting
 2001 Black Dahlia

With David Byrne
 1994 David Byrne
 2012 Love This Giant

With Thomas Chapin
 1992 Insomnia
 1999 Alive

With Dave Douglas
 Mountain Passages (Greenleaf, 2005)
 Spirit Moves (Greenleaf, 2009)
 United Front: Brass Ecstasy at Newport (Greenleaf, 2011)
 Rare Metal (Greenleaf, 2011)

With Spanish Fly
 1994 Rags to Britches
 1996 Fly by Night

With Sting
 2009 If on a Winter's Night...
 2010 Symphonicities
 2013 The Last Ship

With They Might Be Giants
 2004 Indestructible Object
 2011 Album Raises New And Troubling Questions

With Henry Threadgill
 Too Much Sugar for a Dime (Axiom, 1993)
 Carry the Day (Columbia, 1994)
 Makin' a Move (Columbia, 1995)

With Loudon Wainwright III
 2009 High Wide & Handsome: The Charlie Poole Project
 2012 Older Than My Old Man Now

With Victor Wooten
 2012 Sword & Stone
 2012 Words & Tones

With John Zorn
 1992 John Zorn's Cobra: Live at the Knitting Factory
 2002 Cobra: John Zorn's Game Pieces Volume 2
 2011 The Satyr's Play / Cerberus

With others
 1987 No Dummies Allowed, Charlie Persip
 1991 Spirit of Nuff...Nuff, Very Very Circus
 1996 Mundo Civilizado, Arto Lindsay
 1999 Hold the Elevator, Orange Then Blue
 2000 Muy Divertido!, Marc Ribot
 2001 Songs I Heard, Harry Connick Jr.
 2003 Alegría, Wayne Shorter
 2004 Lake Biwa, Wadada Leo Smith
 2004 While the Music Lasts, Jesse Harris
 2008 Yo-Yo Ma & Friends: Songs of Joy & Peace, Yo-Yo Ma
 2009 Arrow, Clare & the Reasons
 2009 Declaration, Donny McCaslin
 2009 Tattoos & Mushrooms, Steven Bernstein
 2009 Trombone Tribe, Roswell Rudd
 2010 Girls Need Attention, Richard Julian
 2010 Heavy Dreaming, Ryan Keberle
 2011 The Gaddabouts, The Gaddabouts
 2012 Manhattan Jazz Orchestra Plays Disney, Manhattan Jazz Orchestra
 2016 Stranger to Stranger, Paul Simon

References

External links
 Marcus Rojas: Finding the Sound World

1963 births
20th-century American musicians
21st-century American musicians
American jazz tubists
American music educators
American tubists
Avant-garde jazz tubists
Brooklyn College faculty
Living people
American male jazz musicians
Manhattan School of Music faculty
Musicians from Brooklyn
New England Conservatory alumni
New York University faculty
State University of New York at Purchase faculty
Jazz musicians from New York (state)
21st-century tubists
20th-century American male musicians
21st-century American male musicians
People from Red Hook, Brooklyn
Spanish Fly (band) members
Ilk Records artists